The 1923–24 season was Manchester United's 28th season in the Football League. It was their second successive season in the Second Division, and after narrowly missing out on promotion a year earlier, they finished a disappointing 14th in the league.

Second Division

FA Cup

References

Manchester United F.C. seasons
Manchester United